Jędrzychowice  is a village in the administrative district of Gmina Wiązów, within Strzelin County, Lower Silesian Voivodeship, in south-western Poland. Prior to 1945 it was in Germany.

Notable residents
 Rudolf Geisler (29 March 1911 – 13 April 1944), Wehrmacht officer

References

Villages in Strzelin County